Nicholas Marcus Thompson (born 16 July 1986) is a Trinidadian-Canadian social justice advocate and union leader known for organizing the landmark $2.5 billion Black Class Action lawsuit against the federal Government of Canada for systemic discrimination against Black workers. He is the Executive Director of the Black Class Action Secretariat, a national non-profit organization that works to dismantling systemic discrimination in all sectors of Canadian life. Thompson is also the host of the Union Matters show, where he advocates for the elimination of racial discrimination in Canada's public service and labor unions.

Early life
Born in Port of Spain, Trinidad, to an Indo-Trinidadian father and an Afro-Trinidadian mother. He migrated to Scarborough, Toronto, Canada as a teenager, where he attended Lester B. Pearson Collegiate Institute and later the University of Toronto.

Thompson joined Canada's public service as an employee of the Canada Revenue Agency, where he became a member of Union of Taxation Employees, a component of the Public Service Alliance of Canada. Thompson was then elected President of Union of Taxation Employees, Toronto North. 

Thompson was soon after elected as Chairperson of Racially Visible Committee (RVC) and Vice-President of the Greater Toronto Area Council of the Public Service Alliance of Canada. In January 2021, Thompson was elected second Alternate Regional Executive Vice President of the Public Service Alliance of Canada, Ontario Region. Thompson serves in these four elected positions simultaneously.

Politics
On May 23, 2019, Thompson was officially nominated as a candidate for the New Democratic Party in the district of Don Valley East in the 2019 Canadian federal election. He received 4,647 votes placing third in a six-way race.

Activism
Thompson challenged the Public Service Alliance of Canada, the largest federal sector union on anti-Black racism. He led Black Lives Matter protests in Toronto calling out Premier Doug Ford for not accepting that systemic racism exists in Canada. Thompson said he needed to see more than kneeling gestures from such officials as former Toronto police Chief Mark Saunders and Prime Minister Justin Trudeau. 

He is the host of Union Matters, an online show which focuses on anti-racism and discrimination issues in the labour movement. The show caused national controversy in September 2020 when Thompson called out a high-profile union executive for anti-Black discrimination, resulting in their resignation.

In his native country, Trinidad and Tobago, he petitioned the government in 2014 over a major corruption scandal called LifeSport. His petition called on the then Prime Minister Kamla Persad-Bissessar and President Anthony Carmona to end their silence and to fire the cabinet minister responsible for the program. Seven days into petitioning, the Minister tendered his resignation. Media outlets attributed the resignation in part to Thompson's petition.

Black Class Action 
Thompson tried to address anti-Black discrimination at the Canada Revenue Agency, the country's tax authority. He made representation on behalf of Black workers to the Commissioner of the Canada Revenue Agency, the Minister of National Revenue, the Clerk of the Privy Council and the Prime Minister Justin Trudeau, to no avail.

He then mobilized Black workers from across the country, including workers from the Canadian Human Rights Commission, the Royal Canadian Mounted Police, the Department of National Defense and Public Prosecutions Canada to file a class action lawsuit.

On December 2, 2020, the landmark case Nicholas Marcus Thompson et al V. Her Majesty was filed, naming the entire federal public service as defendants. Thompson said that Canada’s public service must reflect the people that it serves.

The proposed class-action lawsuit was filed on behalf of Black federal public service employees who faced systemic discrimination related to hiring and promotions since 1970. That was the year that Canada ratified the United Nations International Convention on the Elimination of All Forms of Racial Discrimination.

Around 30,000 Black civil servants have allegedly been deprived of opportunities and benefits afforded to others based on their race since the 1970s.

The claim states that the Employment Equity Act sought to prevent discrimination but in reality, there has allegedly been a de facto practice of Black employee exclusion throughout the public service because of the permeation of systemic discrimination through Canada’s institutional structure..

Awards
In January 2020, Thompson was awarded the Activist of the Year by the Public Service Alliance of Canada's Greater Toronto Area Council.

On February 6, 2021, John Tory, the Mayor of Toronto, proclaimed Bob Marley Day for the 30th year. Thompson was named a recipient of the Bob Marley Day award for his contribution to the advancement and development of his community.

Electoral record

References

External links
 
 Union of Taxation Employees profile

1986 births
Living people
Canadian civil servants
New Democratic Party candidates for the Canadian House of Commons
University of Toronto alumni
Trinidad and Tobago emigrants to Canada
Canadian people of Trinidad and Tobago descent